John DiResta is an American former New York Transit police officer turned comedian, and actor.

Career
He was the title star of a short-lived UPN sitcom called DiResta from 1998-1999.  He has appeared in several films, including Miss Congeniality and its sequel, Miss Congeniality 2: Armed and Fabulous, as well as on the CBS sitcom Rules of Engagement. In 2004 he got a show on FX called Trash to Cash where he and his brother Jimmy Diresta went around buying or finding cheap garbage. Jimmy would build whatever was needed and John act as the comic relief. It lasted one season.

He co-hosted a show with his brother on HGTV. Hammered with John and Jimmy DiResta (premiered September 16, 2006). Jimmy DiResta, an inventor and carpenter, builds intricate projects while John, similar to previous programs, acts as the comic foil.  Hammered aired for two seasons.

John also stars as "Johnny" in an American Chopper spoof series called American Body Shop on Comedy Central that began airing in 2007.

Personal life
John grew up in the Five Towns area of Long Island, with two brothers, Jimmy DiResta and Joe DiResta, and one sister and graduated from Hewlett High School in 1982. Several years ago, he was inducted into the school's hall of fame.

External links
 'Making Fun': Who is Jimmy DiResta? Host of Netflix show creates masterpieces Meaww.com, March 2, 2022
 

American male comedians
21st-century American comedians
American police officers
American television personalities
George W. Hewlett High School alumni
Living people
People from The Five Towns, New York
Year of birth missing (living people)